Royal Agricultural Society can refer to:
 Royal Agricultural Society of England
 Royal Agricultural Society of New South Wales
 Royal Agricultural and Horticultural Society of South Australia
 Royal Agricultural Society of Tasmania
 Royal Agricultural Society of Victoria
 Royal Agricultural Society of Western Australia